Harold Dixon was an American composer, lyricist and publisher.

Published compositions 
 "Davy of the Navy, You're a Wonderful Boy" (1918)
 "Oh Henry! Mammy Surely Paddled Me" (1918)
 "There'll Be a Hot-Time (When the Boys Are Mustered Out)" (1918) (lyrics by Captain Leland-Yerdon)
 "You Great Big Handsome Marine" (1918)
 "We're Going to Get to Berlin Through the Air" (c. 1918)
 "Dixie Lullaby" (1919) (lyrics by David Portoy)
 "I'm Going to Start All Over" (1919) (lyrics by Edwin F. Klein and Jacob Lewis Klein)
 "Louisiana Waltz" (1919) (lyrics by Robert E. Hary)
 "Pretty" (1919)
 "Way Down in Birmingham" (1919) (lyrics by Edwin F. Klein and Jacob Lewis Klein)
 "Call Me Back, Pal O' Mine" (1921) (lyrics by Lawrence Perricone)
 "Mammy Land" (1921) (lyrics by Nomis)
 "Wishing for You" (1921) (lyrics by Mary McMillan)
 "I'll Take You Home Again Pal of Mine" (1922) (music by Claude Sacre)
 "Italian Moon" (1922) (lyrics Bob Causer)
 "Little Pal of Long Ago" (1922) (lyrics by Walter Hirsch and Claude Sacre)
 "Rock Me to Sleep in My Rocky Mountain Home" (1922) (lyrics by Robert E. Harty)
 "Oh, For a Pal Like You" (1924)
 "Till the End o' the World with You" (1925)
 "I'm a Bad Boy Looking for a Good Girl" (1926) (co-written with Sam H. Stept)
 "Snuffins" (1927)
 "Stay Out of the South" (1927)
 The Scarecrows' Convention (1927) (piano solo)

External links 
 Discography of American Historical Recordings (DAHR)
 

American composers
American lyricists
American music publishers (people)
Year of birth missing